Michael Benton Reed (born November 18, 1992) is an American former professional baseball outfielder. He played in Major League Baseball (MLB) for the Milwaukee Brewers, Atlanta Braves, and San Francisco Giants.

High school
Reed was born in Maplewood, Minnesota. Before playing professionally, he attended Leander High School in Leander, Texas. He was named one of the top-200 prospects heading into the 2011 draft, coming in at #160.

Professional career

Milwaukee Brewers
Though some thought he would go as high as the first round in the draft, he was taken by the Milwaukee Brewers in the 5th round of the 2011 Major League Baseball Draft, one pick after pitcher Nick Tropeano. After hitting .232 his first minor league season, he stole 14 bases in 62 games between the Helena Brewers, Brevard County Manatees and Huntsville Stars in 2012 and in 2013, he hit .286 with a .385 on-base percentage, 13 triples and 26 stolen bases in 118 games for the Wisconsin Timber Rattlers. He finished second in the Midwest League in triples and was named to the MiLB.com Organization All-Star team that year. He hit .255 with a .396 on-base percentage and 33 stolen bases in 110 games for the Brevard County Manatees in 2014 after being named the Brewers' 15th-best prospect by MLB.com heading into the season. He was named Player of the Week during the week of May 5. He led the Florida State League in walks and was second in stolen bases as well.

Reed made his Major League Debut on September 26, 2015. Reed was one of nine players who competed to be the Brewers center fielder for the 2016 season. He elected free agency on November 6, 2017.

Atlanta Braves
On February 24, 2018, Reed signed a minor league deal with the Braves. He began the season with the Mississippi Braves and promoted to the Gwinnett Stripers of the Triple-A International League. He was called up to the major leagues on July 2, 2018, but was optioned back to Gwinnett the next day. He was recalled on July 20.

San Francisco Giants
On October 31, 2018, the Minnesota Twins claimed Reed off waivers. On March 23, 2019, the Twins traded Reed to the San Francisco Giants in exchange for John Andreoli and cash. Reed was designated for assignment on April 2, 2019, following the acquisition of Kevin Pillar. Reed was outrighted on April 5, but elected free agency. He re-signed on a minor league deal on the same day. He became a free agent following the 2019 season.

Personal
His father, Benton Reed, played in the National Football League.

References

External links

1992 births
Living people
People from Cedar Park, Texas
Baseball players from Texas
Major League Baseball outfielders
Milwaukee Brewers players
Atlanta Braves players
San Francisco Giants players
Arizona League Brewers players
Helena Brewers players
Brevard County Manatees players
Huntsville Stars players
Wisconsin Timber Rattlers players
Biloxi Shuckers players
Colorado Springs Sky Sox players
Mississippi Braves players
Gwinnett Stripers players
Sacramento River Cats players